The Miss Montana competition is the pageant that selects the representative for the U.S. state of Montana in the Miss America pageant.

Unlike most state pageants in the Miss America system, Montana does not use preliminary local pageants to limit entrants to the state-level competition.

Alexa Baisch of Glendive was crowned Miss Montana 2022 on July 3, 2022 in Billings, Montana at Movement Montana Dance Studio. She competed for the title of Miss America 2023 at the Mohegan Sun in Uncasville, Connecticut at the end of 2022.

Results summary
The following is a visual summary of the past results of Miss Montana titleholders at the national Miss America pageants/competitions. The year in parentheses indicates the year of the national competition during which a placement and/or award was garnered, not the year attached to the contestant's state title.

Placements
 Top 10: Joanna Lester (1962), Yvonne Dehner (1995)
 Top 15: Kay Kittendorf (1940), Patti Luer (1948)
 Top 16: Alexis Wineman (2013)

Awards

Preliminary awards
 Preliminary Talent: Kay Kittendorf (1940), Patti Luer (1948), Diana Pacini (1976), Yvonne Dehner (1995)

Non-finalist awards
 Non-finalist Talent: Dianne Feller (1966), Debbie Reber (1974), Lilly Cruise (1981), Jenni Ramseth (1992), Laura Haller (2019)

Other awards
 Miss Congeniality: Carol Fraser (1949) (tie)
 America's Choice: Alexis Wineman (2013)
 Dr. David B. Allman Medical Scholarship: Janice Frankino (1977), Julie Reil (1988), Mo Shea (2020)
 Quality of Life Award Finalists: Brittany Wiser (2010)
 STEM Scholarship Award Winners: Laura Haller (2019)
 STEM Scholarship Award Finalists: Lauren Scofield (2017), Mo Shea (2020)

Winners

Notes

References

External links

 Miss Montana official website

Montana
Montana culture
Women in Montana
Recurring events established in 1939
1939 establishments in Montana